The Church of St Mary the Virgin is the parish church of Higher Brixham, in the county of Devon, England. It is a listed building of Grade II* and was first listed in 1949.

History 
The church building dates from about the fifteenth century, replacing a previous Norman building. It was re-roofed in 1867 and was restored in 1905. The pillars are similar in design to St Mary's Church, Totnes, which was being built in 1432, and the churches may have shared an architect.

The church contains monuments to the Upton family of Lupton House, and to the judge Francis Buller. Its archives are held by the South West Heritage Trust.

Funding 
The Friends of St Mary's, Brixham, a registered charity (no. 1041867) has the stated aim "to maintain, repair, restore, preserve, improve, beautify and reconstruct for the benefit of the public the fabric of the church".

References

External links
A Church Near You
Brixham Future

Grade II* listed churches in Devon
Buildings and structures in Devon
Brixham
15th-century church buildings in England
Church of England church buildings in Devon